Tall Stories is the second studio album by Johnny Hates Jazz, released by Virgin in 1991. The follow-up to 1988's Turn Back the Clock, Tall Stories features producer and songwriter Phil Thornalley as lead singer, following the departure of the band's frontman Clark Datchler. On the eve of the album's release, Thornalley and keyboardist Calvin Hayes were involved in a serious car crash that depleted the band's momentum. The album failed to chart, and the band subsequently folded.

The album featured contributions from XTC's Dave Gregory (lead guitar) and Kasim Sulton of Utopia (backing vocals).

Background
Following the commercial success of Turn Back the Clock, lead singer Clark Datchler left Johnny Hates Jazz at the end of 1988 to embark on a solo career. Despite the departure, which was described by Nocito in 1992 as "[not] a particularly amicable split", Nocito and Hayes decided to continue. In 1989, after a period of auditioning a number of singers, Nocito and Hayes invited Phil Thornalley to take the role. All three had known each other since childhood and originally recorded "Me and My Foolish Heart" together before Thornalley chose to leave and produce Robbie Nevil instead. Thornalley told the Newcastle Evening Chronicle in 1989: "I dumped them right in it the first time and I was not expecting to be invited back, but it's like coming full circle. I'm doing something I should have been doing five years ago." In addition to his vocal abilities, Thornalley was able to fulfill Datchler's role as the band's songwriter.

The new line-up's first release was the non-album single "Turn the Tide", which reached No. 84 in the UK in late 1989. While the Tall Stories album was completed and delivered to Virgin Records in October 1990, "internal politics" delayed the album's release until the following year. During mid-1991, Thornalley and Hayes were involved in a serious car crash which in turn delayed the album's release to 1992. Tall Stories was a commercial failure, including its two singles, "Let Me Change Your Mind Tonight" and "The Last to Know", although the latter did reach No. 57 in Germany during 1991.

In 2011, Thornalley recalled how both Tall Stories and his 1989 solo album Swamp made him realise "my passion was for writing songs [and] not performing them". Speaking to Paul Sinclair of Super Deluxe Edition in 2013, Nocito said of the album: "We were sort of obligated. Even to me now, it's not a Johnny Hates Jazz album. It didn't feel like one. I can't really listen to that record, some things happened from a personal point of view, my mother died right at that time, Calvin had that car crash. So I don't want to go there." He added to Magic Music Magazine in 2017: "There was a very bad car accident. Terrible timing but luckily nobody died. After the car accident no one wanted to continue."

Critical reception
Upon its release, Music & Media commented, "This new album introduces new lead singer Phil Thornalley. Yet the sound hasn't changed much since the days of their European hit single, 'Shattered Dreams'. The first single, 'Let Me Change Your Mind Tonight', sets the tone for the rest of this melodic, soft pop album." Phil Bryant of The Crawley News wrote, "Tall Stories has a number of influences, bits of Paul McCartney here, George Michael there and Tears for Fears in abundance. The ten songs are all pleasant enough, but maybe there's the rub! Pleasant it may be, but it isn't original."

Jon Selzer of Melody Maker was critical of the album, believing it to have little "approaching a tune" and be full of "clichés and self-pity" instead, particularly the lyrics which he felt concentrated on the theme of "he's split up with his girlfriend and wants her back". He commented, "Tall Stories sounds like the kind of music they play to illustrate trysts in soap operas, where a lovelorn character wanders by a lake to get a free blow-dry, or the touching moment in those human-dramas-on-Bogdon-Pier the Beeb are so good at. Drama, as far as Johnny Hates Jazz are concerned, is a term to be used ironically." Andrew Collins of NME was also negative, noting that Thornalley's replacement of Datchler "[does] not make a sod of difference to the Johnnys' spiritless, dreary coffee table adultsoulpopdirge". He added, "Tall Stories skips like a Triceratops with flat-feet through Lennon rip-off balladry and tortured George Michael ache. It occasionally commits crimes against brass too."

In a review of the 1993 compilation The Very Best of Johnny Hates Jazz, Michael Sutton of AllMusic commented of the three tracks included from Tall Stories, "Sounding no different than anything on Turn Back the Clock, these tracks prove that Johnny Hates Jazz didn't lose their knack for soulful, danceable hooks after Datchler's departure."

Track listing

Personnel 
Johnny Hates Jazz
 Phil Thornalley – lead vocals and backing vocals
 Calvin Hayes – synthesizers, drum machine and backing vocals
 Mike Nocito – bass and backing vocals

Additional musicians
 Chris Newman – Fairlight CMI sampler
 Ole Paulsen – additional synthesizers (2, 4)
 Tommy Faragher – additional synthesizers (3, 6, 8, 9), bass (6), backing vocals (6, 8, 9)
 Dave Gregory – guitar solo (1)
 Phil Palmer – acoustic guitar (2), guitar solo (8)
 Jim Williams – electric guitar (2, 3)
 Graham Brierton – bass (2, 5)
 Tony Beard – drums (1, 6)
 Frank Ricotti – percussions (1, 3, 4, 5, 8, 9), vibraphone solo (4)
 Dan Duncan – big horn (1)
 The Kick Horns (4)
 Simon Clarke – saxophones 
 Tim Sanders – saxophones 
 Roddy Lorimer – trumpet 
 Paul Spong – trumpet
 Molly Duncan – tenor saxophone (10)
 New World Symphonia – strings (1, 3)
 Del Newman – string arrangements and conductor (1, 3)
 Colin Campsie – backing vocals (1)
 Kasim Sulton – backing vocals (2)
 Tom Bailey – Eastern interlude (2)
 Kim Wilde – backing vocals (3, 5)

Production 
 Calvin Hayes – producer, mixing (3-10)
 Mike Nocito – producer, engineer, mixing (3, 4, 5, 8, 9, 10)
 Tom Lord-Alge – mixing (1, 2)
 Roy Spong – mixing (3, 4, 5, 8, 9, 10)
 Phil Thornalley – mixing (6, 7)
 Michael Ade – additional engineer
 Henry Binns – additional engineer 
 Eddie Briquet – additional engineer
 El Davinci – additional engineer
 Chris Dickie – additional engineer 
 Dan Duncan – additional engineer
 Steve Gallagher – additional engineer
 Mike Jarret – additional engineer 
 Richard Norris – additional engineer
 Ren Swan – additional engineer
 Mystery Tim – additional engineer
 Daren Walder – additional engineer
 Helen Woodward – additional engineer
 Larry Vigon – art direction, design
 Brian Jackson – design
 Chris Callis – photography
 Cyndy Warlow – stylist

Studios
 Recorded at RAK Studios (London, UK).
 Additional engineering at RAK Studios, Abbey Road Studios, Master Rock Studios, Olympic Studios and The Swamp Studios (London, UK); The Manor Studio (Oxford, UK); Madfly Studio (New York City, New York, USA); Encore Studios (Burbank, California, USA).
 Mixed at RAK Studios and Encore Studios.

References

1991 albums
Virgin Records albums
Johnny Hates Jazz albums